Aage Brix (December 9, 1894 – March 16, 1963) was a former U.S. soccer forward who earned one cap with the U.S. national team at the 1924 Summer Olympics.  The U.S. won the game, 1-0 against Estonia, its first game of the Olympics.  Brix, a doctor, played as an amateur with the Los Angeles Athletic Club's soccer team.  During the game against Estonia, he punctured his liver, ending his international career.

He was born in Lexington, Nebraska and died in Los Angeles, California.

References

1894 births
1963 deaths
American soccer players
United States men's international soccer players
Olympic soccer players of the United States
Footballers at the 1924 Summer Olympics
Soccer players from Nebraska
People from Lexington, Nebraska
Association football forwards